Northumberland Street is a major shopping street in the city of Newcastle upon Tyne, in the North East of England. It is home to a wide range of different retailers, banks and cafes, and in terms of rental per square foot, Northumberland Street is the most expensive location in the UK outside London to own a shop. There are currently over 51 retailers including pubs on Newcastle's Northumberland Street.

Location 
The street runs from the Haymarket Interchange Metro station and The Newcastle Civic Centre in the north, towards Pilgrim Street and the Monument Metro station at the south. It encompasses the entrance to the Eldon Square Shopping Centre It also houses the entrance to the Monument Mall Shopping Centre.

South of Blackett Street, Northumberland Street ends at the junction with Pilgrim Street which runs to the Tyne Bridge.  From the opening of the bridge in 1928 until the opening of the Tyne Tunnel in 1967, Northumberland Street was part of the A1 between London and Edinburgh. It is now pedestrianised.

Until 1999, the most northerly section of Northumberland Street from Northumberland Road onwards was still open to traffic and a busy bus route, which led to the shops in this part of the street being much less popular than those farther south. This section is now pedestrianised in keeping with the remainder of the street. However, some electronic maps still show this part as an accessible road.

Delivery traffic is still permitted to drive up Northumberland Street in the early morning to complete deliveries, but, after that, all non-pedestrian traffic is banned, including bicycles and skateboards.

Retailers 

Here is a list of some of the retailers, cafes and banks that can be found on Northumberland Street as of September 2012:

3 Store
BANK
Barclays
BHS Closed
Boots
Burger King
Card Factory
Carphone Warehouse
Clas Ohlson Closed Mid 2017
Costa Coffee
Cruise
Currys & PC World
Cotswolds
EE
Fenwick
First Sport (Now JD Sports) 
Greggs
Greggs Moment
Phones 4 U
Halifax
H&M
H Samuel
JD Sports
Lloyds TSB
Marks & Spencer
M&S - Kitchen
Magic Box
McDonald's
Moss Bros
O2
Newcastle Building Society
NatWest
Northern Rock (Virgin Money)
Pret a Manger
Primark
Sainsbury's
Santander
Scotts
Sports Direct
Starbucks
Superdrug
Thomas Cook
Thompson
TK Maxx
Yorkshire Building Society
Vodafone
W H Smith

References

Geography of Newcastle upon Tyne
Shopping streets in England
Tourist attractions in Newcastle upon Tyne
Roads in Tyne and Wear